Odipolama is a 2009 Indian Tamil-language romance film directed by Kanmani, starring newcomer, Parimal and Sandhya, whilst Kota Srinivasa Rao plays a pivotal role. The film released on 25 December 2009.

Plot
Visu (Parimal) is a computer science student who loves to spend time with his friends (led by Suman Setty). Though he is initially portrayed as a bookworm, it is made known in later scenes that he is a happy-go-lucky youngster. Hailing from an affluent family, he lives his own life. He comes across Anjali (Sandhya), also a computer science student. Visu falls in love with Anjali. After locating her whereabouts, he moves close to her residence. But problems begin after he goes behind her. A series of events forces Anjali to elope. She takes the bus in which Visu travels. It appears that Visu and Anjali had eloped together, but that isn't the case. There are a host of interesting events and encounters between them that eventually ends on a positive note.

Cast
 Parimal as Visu
 Sandhya as Anjali
 Kota Srinivasa Rao as Anjali's father
 Suman Setty as Visu's friend
 Sudha as Vasundhara
 Mahadevan as Anjali's uncle
 Thambi Ramaiah as Visu's uncle
 Raja Sridhar as Vijay
 Dhanraj as Visu's friend
 Rajyalakshmi as Anjali's mother
 Chelladurai as Store owner
 Rahasya in an item number in "Puchandi"

Production
The film marked the debut of actress Sangeetha's brother Parimal, in a leading role. Sandhya lost weight to play a college student in the film.

Soundtrack
The soundtrack was composed by D. Imman. The soundtrack received positive reviews. A critic wrote that "As if to make up for his past debacles, composer Imman evolves and show promise, if only half-heartedly".

Release 
The film was dubbed in Telugu as Nuvve Naa Sakhi with a few portions reshot including the hero introduction song ('Ading Ading') at the Golconda Fort. Sampath Nandi wrote the dialogues for the Telugu dub.

Reception
The film received a positive response from critics and audience. The Hindu wrote that "Director Kanmani who is also in charge of the story, screenplay and dialogue has passed the acid test with a fair degree of success in all departments. The New Indian Express wrote that "Overall, 'Odipolama' is a promising effort from a debutant filmmaker".

Box office
The film had a below-average opening at the Chennai box office.

References

External links

2009 films
2000s Tamil-language films
Indian romance films
Films scored by D. Imman
2009 romance films